Anton "Toni" Hackl (25 March 1915 – 10 July 1984) was a German Luftwaffe military aviator during World War II, a fighter ace credited with 192 enemy aircraft shot down in over 1,000 combat missions. The majority of his victories were claimed over the Eastern Front, with 87 claims over the Western Front. Of his 87 victories over the Western Allies, at least 32 were four-engined bombers, a further 24 victories were unconfirmed.

List of aerial victories claimed
According to US historian David T. Zabecki, Hackl was credited with 192 aerial victories. Bergström and Mikhailov state that Hackl flew about 1,000 combat missions and also list him with shooting down 192 enemy aircraft plus another 24 unconfirmed aerial victories. Of this figure, 105 victories were claimed while serving on the Eastern Front and 87 on the Western Front. Among these numbers are 34 four-engined bombers which puts him in second place behind Georg-Peter Eder as the leading daylight bomber claimant. Mathews and Foreman, authors of Luftwaffe Aces – Biographies and Victory Claims, researched the German Federal Archives and state that Hackl was credited with more than 180 aerial victories. This figure includes at least 103 claims made on the Eastern Front and 44 on the Western Front, including at least 16 four-engined bombers.

Victory claims were logged to a map-reference (PQ = Planquadrat), for example "PQ 35 Ost 53224". These sectors were then subdivided into 36 smaller units to give a location area 3 × 4 km in size.

Notes

References

Citations

Bibliography

 
 
 
 
 
 
 
 
 
 
 
 
 
 
 
 
 
 

Aerial victories of Hackl, Anton
Hackl, Anton
Aviation in World War II